The girls' ice hockey tournament at the 2012 Winter Youth Olympics was held from 13 to 22 January at the Tyrolean Ice Arena in Innsbruck, Austria.

Rosters

Each country is allowed to enter 17 athletes each.

Preliminary round
All times are local (UTC+1).

Playoffs

Bracket

Semifinals

Bronze medal game

Gold medal game

References

Ice hockey at the 2012 Winter Youth Olympics
Oly